Cole Cabana (born December 19, 2004) is an American football running back for the Michigan Wolverines.

Early years and high school career
Cabana was born in 2004. His father, Mike Cabana, played football at the linebacker position for the 1994 Albion Britons football team that won the NCAA Division III national championship.

Cabana attended Dexter High School in Dexter, Michigan.

As a junior in 2021, Cabana rushed for 1,688 yards with 24 touchdowns and added 368 receiving yards with four touchdowns.

As a senior in 2022, Cabana led the team to a 12–1 record and tallied 2,434 all-purpose yards and 36 touchdowns, including 1,518 rushing yards (27 touchdowns), 472 receiving yards (six receiving touchdowns), and 444 return yards (three return touchdowns).

He was rated by ESPN and 247Sports as the No. 2 player in Michigan. He was also rated as one of the top running backs in the country, receiving the No. 5 ranking by Rivals.com and No. 6 by ESPN.

Cabana also competed in track at Dexter. He was twice selected as an All-American sprinter.

College career
In February 2022, Cabana committed to play college football for the Michigan Wolverines football team. He enrolled early at the University of Michigan in December 2022.

References

External links
 Michigan Wolverines bio

2004 births
Living people
American football running backs
Michigan Wolverines football players
People from Dexter, Michigan
Players of American football from Michigan